The 2015–16 Sacred Heart Pioneers men's basketball team represented Sacred Heart University during the 2015–16 NCAA Division I men's basketball season. This was the Pioneers' 17th season of NCAA Division I basketball, all played in the Northeast Conference. The Pioneers were led by third year head coach Anthony Latina and played their home games at the William H. Pitt Center. They finished the season 12–18, 11–7 in NEC play to finish in a three was tie for second place. They lost in the quarterfinals of the NEC tournament to LIU Brooklyn.

Roster

Schedule

|-
!colspan=9 style="background:#990000; color:#999999;"| Exhibition

|-
!colspan=9 style="background:#990000; color:#999999;"| Non-conference regular season

|-
!colspan=9 style="background:#990000; color:#999999;"| Northeast Conference regular season

|-
!colspan=9 style="background:#990000; color:#999999;"| NEC tournament

References 

Sacred Heart Pioneers men's basketball seasons
Sacred Heart
Sacred Heart Pioneers men's b
Sacred Heart Pioneers men's b